Beware Spooks! is a 1939 American comedy film directed by Edward Sedgwick and starring Joe E. Brown, Mary Carlisle and Clarence Kolb.

Synopsis
Rookie cop Roy L. Gifford is kicked off the force after he accidentally assists a bank robbery and then lets a killer escape. Attempting to restore his reputation he tracks down the criminals to a haunted fun house where, with his wife's assistance, he tries to bring the murderer to justice.

Cast
 Joe E. Brown as Roy L. Gifford
 Mary Carlisle as 	Betty Lou Winters Gifford
 Clarence Kolb as 	Commissioner Lester Lewis
 Marc Lawrence as Slick Eastman
 Don Beddoe as Nick Bruno
 George J. Lewis as 	Danny Emmett
 Howard Hickman as 	Judge Roth
 Eddie Laughton as 	Dr. Johnson
 Frank M. Thomas as 	Capt. Wood 
 Iris Meredith as 	Babe, Spook House Ticket Seller 
 Ethelreda Leopold as 	Pretty Girl
 Ralph Dunn as 	Police Sergeant
 Robert Sterling as 	Bellboy
 Byron Foulger as 	Bank Cashier
 Walter Sande as 	Policeman
 Robert B. Williams as Policeman

References

Bibliography
 Gehring, Wes D. Joe E. Brown: Film Comedian and Baseball Buffoon. McFarland, 2014.

External links
 

1939 films
1939 comedy films
1930s English-language films
American comedy films
Films directed by Edward Sedgwick
Columbia Pictures films
American black-and-white films
1930s American films